Bull Run Marina Regional Park is a park in Clifton, Virginia, along Bull Run. The park has  of preserved land.

The park has a marina, and has parts of the Bull Run-Occoquan Trail in it. The park hosts many events in crew and is a practice area for the Lake Braddock Secondary School crew team.

External links 
Bull Run Marina Regional Park

NOVA Parks
Clifton, Virginia
Parks in Fairfax County, Virginia
Regional parks in the United States